Marcel Marchant Airport,  is an airport in the northeast section of Puerto Montt, a port city in the Los Lagos Region of Chile.

Marcel Marchant Airport serves as a hub for Aerocord and Pewen, two small regional airlines with daily flights to Northern Chilean Patagonia. Both airlines offer regular daily flights to Chaiten and Melinka, as well as charters to Futaleufú, Palena, and La Junta.

See also

Transport in Chile
List of airports in Chile

References

External links
OpenStreetMap - Marcel Marchant
OurAirports - Marcel Marchant
SkyVector - Marcel Marchant
FallingRain - Marcel Marchant Airport

Airports in Chile
Airports in Los Lagos Region